Rajkumar Udaybhan Narain Singh (born 4 December 1973 in New Delhi, India) is an Indian politician who was the Independent Director of JIADA (Jharkhand Industrial Area Development Authority) in the Government of Jharkhand and was one of the leaders of the Jharkhand Vikas Morcha  but later joined Bhartiya Janta Party in 2013. Being close to Rajnath Singh,  gained popularity in the party also. Belongs to the erstwhile royal family of Ramgarh Raj  and has a strong hold over the North Chotanagpur belt (Chatra, Hazaribagh, etc). Singh is grandson of Maharaj Kumar Dr. Basant Narain Singh who served as 4 times MP from Hazaribagh aur also 2 times MLA from Hazaribagh.

References 

1973 births
Jharkhand Vikas Morcha (Prajatantrik) politicians
Bharatiya Janata Party politicians from Jharkhand
People from New Delhi
Living people